Jean-Pierre Mocky (6 July 1929 – 8 August 2019), pseudonym of Jean-Paul Adam Mokiejewski, was a French film director, actor, screenwriter and producer.

Life and career
Mocky was born in Nice, France to Polish immigrant parents, Jeanne Zylinska and Adam Mokiejewski. His father was Jewish and his mother was Catholic.

Mocky appeared as an actor in the 1955 film Gli Sbandati and in many other movies, including some of those he also directed (Solo, L'albatros, L'Ombre d'une chance, Un Linceul n'a pas de poches). His 1987 film Le Miraculé was entered into the 37th Berlin International Film Festival.He began as an actor in the cinema and theater. In particular, he played in Jean Dréville's Les Casse-pieds (1948), Jean Cocteau's Orphée (1950) and Bernard Borderie's The Mask of the Gorilla (1957). But it was especially in Italy that he became famous, thanks to his role in I vinti by Michelangelo Antonioni.

After working as an assistant with Luchino Visconti on Senso (1954) and Federico Fellini on La strada (1954), he wrote his first film, La Tête contre les murs (1959) and planned to direct it himself, but the producer preferred to entrust the task to Georges Franju. He went on to direct the following year with Les Dragueurs (1959). Since then, he has never stopped shooting. 

As early as the 1960s, he was able to reach a wide audience with crazy comedies such as A Funny Parishioner (1963) and La Grande Lessive (1968). After May 1968, he turned to darker films with Solo (1969), in which he shows a group of young terrorists of the extreme left, then L'Albatros (1971) which shows the corruption of politicians. 

In the 1980s, he returned to success with a film denouncing, a year before the drama of Heysel, the excesses of some football fans (À mort l'arbitre, 1984) and a comedy denouncing the hypocrisy around the pilgrimage to Lourdes (Le Miraculé, 1987). In the 1990s and 2000s, his films met with less success, but Mocky continued to shoot with much enthusiasm.  

In the beginning, his films were dedicated to the uprising against the restrictions imposed by society. Later, he concentrated on farce, as in Bonsoir where the homeless Alex (Michel Serrault) pretends to be the lover of the lesbian Caroline (Claude Jade) in order to save her inheritance from her homophobic relatives. 

Mocky's cinema, often satirical and pamphleteer, is generally inspired by the truth of society. He worked with few resources and filmed very quickly. He worked with Bourvil (A Funny Parishioner, The City of Unspeakable Fear, La Grande Lessive and The Stallion), Fernandel (The Exchange and Life), Michel Simon (The Red Ibis), Michel Serrault (twelve films including Le Miraculé), Francis Blanche (five films including The City of Unspeakable Fear), Jacqueline Maillan (five films), Jean Poiret (eight films) and with the stars Catherine Deneuve (Agent Trouble), Claude Jade (Bonsoir), Jane Birkin (Noir comme le souvenir), Jeanne Moreau (Le Miraculé) and Stéphane Audran (The Seasons of Pleasure).

In 2010, he received the Prix Henri-Langlois for his entire career and the 2013 Alphonse Allais Prize. The International Festival of Film Entrevues in Belfort in 2012 and the Cinémathèque française in 2014 dedicated full retrospectives to him.

He died on 8 August 2019.

 Filmography (as director) 

1960s
 1960 : Les Dragueurs starring Jacques Charrier, Charles Aznavour
 1960 : Un couple starring Juliette Mayniel, Francis Blanche
 1961 : Snobs ! starring Véronique Nordey, Francis Blanche
 1962 : Les Vierges starring Charles Aznavour, Jean Poiret
 1963 : Un drôle de paroissien starring Bourvil, Jean Poiret
 1964 : La Grande Frousse / La Cité de l'Indicible Peur starring Bourvil, Francis Blanche
 1965 : Your Money or Your Life starring Fernandel, Heinz Rühmann
 1966 : Les Compagnons de la marguerite starring Claude Rich, Michel Serrault
 1968 : La Grande Lessive starring Bourvil, Francis Blanche

1970s
 1970 : L'Étalon starring Bourvil, Francis Blanche
 1970 : Solo starring Jean-Pierre Mocky, Anne Deleuze
 1971 : L'Albatros starring Jean-Pierre Mocky, Marion Game
 1972 : Chut starring Jacques Dufilho, Michael Lonsdale
 1973 : L'Ombre d'une chance starring Jean-Pierre Mocky, Robert Benoit
 1974 : Un Linceul n'a pas de poches starring Jean-Pierre Mocky, 
 1975 : L'Ibis rouge starring Michel Serrault, Michel Simon
 1976 : Le Roi des bricoleurs starring Sim, Michel Serrault
 1978 : Le Témoin starring Alberto Sordi, Philippe Noiret
 1979 : Le Piège à cons starring Jean-Pierre Mocky, Catherine Leprince

1980s
 1982 : Litan starring Jean-Pierre Mocky, Marie-José Nat
 1982 : Y a-t-il un Français dans la salle ? starring Victor Lanoux, Jacques Dutronc
 1983 : À mort l'arbitre starring Michel Serrault, Eddy Mitchell
 1985 : Le Pactole starring Richard Bohringer, Patrick Sébastien
 1986 : La Machine à découdre 1986 : Le Miraculé starring Michel Serrault, Jeanne Moreau
 1987 : Agent trouble starring Catherine Deneuve, Richard Bohringer
 1987 : Les Saisons du plaisir starring Charles Vanel, Denise Grey
 1988 : Une nuit à l'Assemblée Nationale starring Michel Blanc, Jacqueline Maillan
 1988 : Nice is Nice (short movie)
 1988 : Méliès 88 1988 : Divine enfant starring Laura Martel, Jean-Pierre Mocky

1990s
 1990 : Il gèle en enfer starring  Jean-Pierre Mocky, Laura Grandt
 1991 : La Méthode Barnol (short movie)
 1991 : La vérité qui tue (short movie)
 1991 : Dis-moi qui tu hais (short movie)
 1991 :  starring Tom Novembre, Michel Serrault
 1992 : Le Mari de Léon 1992 : Bonsoir starring Michel Serrault, Claude Jade
 1995 : Noir comme le souvenir (Black for Remembrance) with Jane Birkin, Sabine Azema, Mattias Habich
 1997 : Robin des mers 1997 : Alliance cherche doigt 1998 : Vidange 1999 : Tout est calme 1999 : La candide madame Duff2000s
 2000 : Le Glandeur 2001 : La Bête de miséricorde 2002 : Les Araignées de la nuit 2003 :  starring Michel Serrault, Jacques Villeret
 2004 : Touristes, oh yes ! 2004 : Les Ballets écarlates 2005 :  starring Michel Serrault, Charles Berling
 2006 : Le Deal 2007 :  starring Michel Serrault, Jean-Claude Dreyfus
 2007 : 13 French Street 2007 : Le Diable en embuscade (short movie)

2010s
 2011 : Crédit pour tous 2011 : Les Insomniaques 2011 : Le dossier Toroto 2013 : Le Mentor 2012 : À votre bon cœur, mesdames 2013 : Dors mon lapin 2013 : Le Renard jaune 2014 : Le Mystère des jonquilles 2014 : Calomnies 2015 : Tu es si jolie ce soir 2015 : Les Compagnons de la pomponette 2015 : Monsieur Cauchemar 2016 : Le Cabanon rose 2016 : Rouges étaient les lilas 2017 : Vénéneuses 2017 : Votez pour moi 2019 : Tous flics ! Filmography (as actor) 
 God Needs Men (1950)
 I vinti (1953)
 Stain in the Snow (1954)
 The Big Flag (1954) 
  Le Comte de Monte-Cristo (1954)
  Gli Sbandati (1955)
  Le rouge est mis (1957)
  La Tête contre les murs (1959)
  Solo (1970)
  À mort l'arbitre! (1984)
  Vidange (1998)
  Americano'' (2011)

Bibliography

References

External links

 

1929 births
2019 deaths
French film directors
French people of Polish-Jewish descent
Male actors from Nice, France
French male screenwriters
French screenwriters
French male film actors
French male television actors
French male stage actors
French National Academy of Dramatic Arts alumni